A land exchange or land swap is the exchange of land between two parties, typically a private owner and a government. These parties may include farmers, estate owners, nature organizations, and governments. Land swaps may also take place between two sovereign nations for practical, geographical or economic reasons.

The exchange of land is undertaken for a variety of reasons, among them the conversion or rehabilitation of a parcel of land to nature. For example, after the Netherlands designated the Dutch National Ecological Network, provincial governments in the country established programs offering financial and organizational assistance for the acquisition of agricultural land and its restoration to more natural habitats.

Examples

Bangladesh
 India–Bangladesh enclaves

India
 India–Bangladesh enclaves

Jordan
 Jordan transfer desert lands to Saudi Arabia in exchange to land south of Aqaba in 1965 so Jordan can extend it's only sea excess.

United Kingdom
The township of Boycott (in the parish of Stowe), transferred to Buckinghamshire.
The parish of Swineshead was an exclave of the county surrounded by Bedfordshire, 1278 acres (517 ha). In 1896, the parish was transferred to Bedfordshire in exchange for the parish of Tilbrook.

United States
United States–Mexico Rio Grande Border Finalization
 Anglo-American Convention of 1818

Notes

References

Further reading

Land law